Strange Ranger, formerly Sioux Falls, is an American indie rock band from Portland, Oregon.

History
In 2016, Sioux Falls released their debut full-length album, Rot Forever, on Broken World Media. Later in 2016, the band changed their name to Strange Ranger. In 2017, Strange Ranger released their first album under their new name, titled Daymoon. In 2019, Strange Ranger released their third full-length album as a band (second as Strange Ranger), titled Remembering the Rockets.

Discography
Studio albums

as Sioux Falls
 Rot Forever (2016, Broken World Media)

as Strange Ranger
 Daymoon (2017, Tiny Engines)
 Remembering the Rockets (2019, Tiny Engines)

References

Musical groups from Portland, Oregon
Tiny Engines artists